In theology, divine light (also called divine radiance or divine refulgence) is an aspect of divine presence perceived as light during a theophany or vision, or represented as such in allegory or metaphor.

The term "light" has been widely used in spirituality and religion, such as:

 An Nūr – Islamic term and concept, referenced in Surah an-Nur and Ayat an-Nur of the Quran.
 Inner light – Christian concept and Quaker doctrine.
 Jyoti or Jyot – a holy flame that is lit with cotton wicks and ghee or mustard oil. It is the prayer ritual of devotional worship performed by Hindus offer to the deities. Jyoti is also a representation of the divine light and a form of the Hindu goddess Durga shakti.
 Ohr Ein Sof – in Rabbinic Judaism and Kabbalah.
  – Kashmiri Shaiva concept of the light of Divine Consciousness of Shiva.
 Tabor Light – the uncreated light revealed to the apostles present during the Transfiguration of Jesus; also experienced as illumination on the path to theosis in Eastern Orthodox theology during theoria, a form of Christian contemplation.

Buddhism 
Buddhist scripture speaks of numerous buddhas of light, including a Buddha of Boundless Light, a Buddha of Unimpeded Light, and the Buddhas of Unopposed Light, of Pure Light, of Incomparable Light, and of Unceasing Light.

Christianity 

Bible commentators such as John W. Ritenbaugh see the presence of light as a metaphor of truth, good and evil, knowledge, and ignorance. In the first Chapter of the Bible, Elohim is described as creating light by fiat and seeing the light to be good.

Eastern Orthodoxy 
In the Eastern Orthodox tradition, the Divine Light illuminates the intellect of man through "theoria" or contemplation. In the Gospel of John, the opening verses describe God as Light: "In Him was life and the life was the light of men. And the light shines in the darkness and the darkness did not comprehend it." (John 1:5)

In John 8:12, Christ proclaims "I am the light of the world", bringing the Divine Light to mankind. The Tabor Light, also called the Uncreated Light, was revealed to the three apostles present at the Transfiguration.

Quakers 
Quakers, known formally as the Religious Society of Friends, are generally united by a belief in each human's ability to experience the light within or see "that of God in every one". Most Quakers believe in continuing revelation: that God continuously reveals truth directly to individuals. George Fox said, "Christ has come to teach His people Himself." Friends often focus on feeling the presence of God. As Isaac Penington wrote in 1670, "It is not enough to hear of Christ, or read of Christ, but this is the thing – to feel him to be my root, my life, and my foundation..." Quakers reject the idea of priests, believing in the priesthood of all believers. Some express their concept of God using phrases such as "the inner light", "inward light of Christ", or "Holy Spirit". Quakers first gathered around George Fox in the mid-17th century and belong to a historically Protestant Christian set of denominations.

Hinduism 
In Hinduism, Diwali—the festival of lights—is a celebration of the victory of light over darkness. A mantra in Bṛhadāraṇyaka Upaniṣad (1.3.28) urges to God: "from darkness, lead us unto light". The Rig Veda includes nearly two dozen hymns to the dawn and its goddess, Ushas.

Sant Mat 
In the terminology of Sant Mat, Light and Sound are the two main and expressions of God and from them all the creation comes into existence. Inner Light (and Inner Sound) can be experienced with and after an initiation by a competent Guru during meditation, and are considered the better way to reach Enlightenment.

Manichaeism 
Manichaeism, the most widespread Western religion prior to Christianity, was based on the belief that God was, literally, light. From about 250-350 CE, devout Manichaeans followed the teachings of self-proclaimed prophet Mani. Mani's faithful, who could be found from Greece to China, believed in warring kingdoms of Light and Darkness, in "beings of light," and in a Father of Light who would conquer the demons of darkness and remake the earth through shards of light found in human souls. Manichaeism also co-opted other religions, including Buddhist teachings in its scripture and worshipping Jesus the Luminous who was crucified on a cross of pure light.

Among the many followers of Manichaeism was the young Augustine, who later wrote, "I thought that you, Lord God and Truth, were like a luminous body of immense size, and myself a bit of that body." When he converted to Christianity in 386 CE, Augustine denounced Manichaeism. By then, Manichaeism had been supplanted by ascendant Christianity.

Manichaeism's legacy is the word Manichaean—relating to a dualistic view of the world, dividing things into either good or evil, light or dark, black or white.

Neoplatonism 
In On the Mysteries of the Egyptians, Chaldeans, and Assyrians, Iamblichus refers to the divine light as the manifestation of the gods by which divination, theurgy, and other forms of ritual are accomplished.

Zoroastrianism
Light is a core concept in Iranian mysticism. The root of this thought lies in Zoroastrian beliefs, which define the supreme God, Ahura Mazda, as the source of light. This essential attribute is manifested in various schools of thought in Persian mysticism and philosophy. Later, this notion was dispersed across the entire Middle East, shaping the paradigms of religions and philosophies emerging in the region. After the Arab invasion, this concept was incorporated into Islamic teachings by Iranian thinkers, the most famous of them being Shahab al-Din Suhrawardi, the founder of the illumination philosophy.

See also

References 

Conceptions of God
Light and religion